Saperda subobliterata is a species of beetle in the family Cerambycidae. It was described by Maurice Pic in 1910. It is known from China, Japan and Russia.

References

subobliterata
Beetles described in 1910